TU Andromedae (TU And) is a variable star of the Mira type in the constellation Andromeda.  It has a spectral type of M5e and a visual magnitude which varies between extremes of 7.6 and 13.5.

Like all the stars of this kind, TU And is a cool asymptotic giant branch star, meaning it is fusing hydrogen and helium in concentric shells outside an inert core of carbon and oxygen formed earlier in its life on the horizontal branch.  Its period is stable at 316.8 days.

The modelled properties of TU Andromedae at maximum brightness are not in agreement with available models of Mira stars (which work for Mira itself).  It is uncertain if the problem is in the measured parameters of the star or in imperfections of the models.  It had a mass between 1.15 and  when it was on the main sequence but is now less massive.

References

Andromeda (constellation)
002890
Mira variables
Andromedae
M-type giants
Emission-line stars
002546